Man from Del Rio is a 1956 American Western film directed by Harry Horner and written by Richard Carr. The film stars Anthony Quinn, Katy Jurado, Peter Whitney, Douglas Fowley, John Larch, Whit Bissell and Douglas Spencer. The film was released October 30, 1956, by United Artists.

Plot
Dave is a gunfighter who beats two other gunfighters in a duel and gets hired as the new sheriff. His popularity with the lower elements of the society quickly fades away and the rich begin to despise him.

Cast 
Anthony Quinn as Dave Robles
Katy Jurado as Estella
Peter Whitney as Ed Bannister
Douglas Fowley as Doc Adams
John Larch as Bill Dawson
Whit Bissell as Breezy Morgan
Douglas Spencer as Sheriff Jack Tillman
Guinn "Big Boy" Williams as Fred Jasper

References

External links 
 

1956 films
1956 Western (genre) films
American black-and-white films
American Western (genre) films
Films directed by Harry Horner
United Artists films
1950s English-language films
1950s American films